HBO Storybook Musicals is a series of television specials that aired on HBO, combining animation that is true to the original storybook's illustrations, plus high-spirited songs from musical songwriters. The specials have also aired on HBO Family.

Background
When Doctor DeSoto was nominated for an Academy Award for a Best Animated Short film, HBO and Michael Sporn agreed to make animated specials for the network. HBO also oriented on family-friendly programs and never financed/produced a children's television series. Michael Sporn directed and produced Lyle, Lyle, Crocodile: The Musical, HBO's first animated television special and aired on November 18, 1987. Then, HBO presented a few animated specials, such as The Story of the Dancing Frog (aired in October 1989), The Red Shoes and Earthday Birthday, both aired in early 1990. The specials combined illustrations with songs.

Episodes
The first four episodes originally aired as individual, stand-alone TV specials; the HBO Storybook Musicals branding was introduced with the fifth episode. 18 episodes of HBO Storybook Musicals aired from 1987 to 1993. In addition, only eight episodes are currently owned by Home Box Office, while others are owned by other distributors, such as WildBrain (formerly known as DHX Media) and First Run Features.

References

1980s American animated television series
1990s American animated television series
1980s American anthology television series
1990s American anthology television series
1987 American television series debuts
1993 American television series endings
American children's animated anthology television series
American children's animated education television series
American children's animated musical television series
English-language television shows
HBO network specials
HBO original programming
Reading and literacy television series
Television series by Home Box Office